Women's Volunteer Service could refer to one of several organisations:

 The Women’s Royal Voluntary Service, known until 1966 as the Women's Voluntary Service
 The Women's Volunteer Services (World War II Poland)
 The Women's Volunteer Service Corps (World War II Canada)